FC Khutrovyk Tysmenytsia is an amateur Ukrainian football team based in Tysmenytsia, Ivano-Frankivsk Oblast. It plays in the Ivano-Frankivsk Oblast Second League (season 2018–19).

The team spent three years in the Ukrainian Second Division before it withdrew at the end of the 1997–98 season.

League and cup history

{|class="wikitable"
|-bgcolor="#efefef"
! Season
! Div.
! Pos.
! Pl.
! W
! D
! L
! GS
! GA
! P
!Domestic Cup
!colspan=2|Europe
!Notes
|-
|align=center|1995–96
|align=center|3rd "A"
|align=center bgcolor=tan|3
|align=center|40
|align=center|24
|align=center|3
|align=center|13
|align=center|66
|align=center|33
|align=center|75
|align=center|
|align=center|
|align=center|
|align=center|
|-
|align=center|1996–97
|align=center|3rd "A"
|align=center bgcolor=tan|3
|align=center|30
|align=center|17
|align=center|7
|align=center|6
|align=center|41
|align=center|21
|align=center|58
|align=center|
|align=center|
|align=center|
|align=center|
|-
|align=center|1997–98
|align=center|3rd "A"
|align=center|17
|align=center|34
|align=center|11
|align=center|5
|align=center|18
|align=center|35
|align=center|49
|align=center|38
|align=center|
|align=center|
|align=center|
|align=center bgcolor=pink|Relegation playoff winnerwithdrew
|}

References

External links
 Unofficial webpage

 
Amateur football clubs in Ukraine
Sport in Tysmenytsia
Football clubs in Ivano-Frankivsk Oblast
Association football clubs established in 1958
1958 establishments in Ukraine